Randall Matthew Batinkoff (born October 16, 1968) is an American actor, known for his roles in the films For Keeps, School Ties, and Higher Learning.

Early life and education
Batinkoff was born in Monticello, New York, the son of Barbara (née Carnel) and Barry Batinkoff, a photographer. He was raised near Ferndale, New York. His sister is event planner Stephanie Winston Wolkoff. After his parents divorced, his mother remarried to Bruce Winston, the son of jeweler Harry Winston. Batinkoff attended Phillips Academy in Andover, Massachusetts and Brown University in Rhode Island, receiving a Bachelor of Arts in international relations.

Career
Batinkoff made his television debut in a 1974 commercial, after an agent spotted him at a toy store. He appeared in several made-for-television films in the 1980s, such as The Stepford Children, before being cast opposite teen starlet Molly Ringwald in the 1988 comedy, For Keeps. He starred as Terrance Dean on the short-lived CBS series, Better Days which only lasted 5 weeks before being canceled. In the early 1990s, Batinkoff had roles in several widely released films, including Buffy the Vampire Slayer, The Player, School Ties (all released 1992) and 1995's Higher Learning. From 1994 to 1995, he played Reverend David Grantland on the CBS television series, Christy. He also appeared in the 1997 film As Good as It Gets where he shared an on-screen kiss with Helen Hunt.

Batinkoff still acts regularly in television, on stage, and in films. He most recently appeared in the made-for-television movies Skip Tracer and Black Widow, and the film The Last Lullaby and Munger Road.

Personal life
Batinkoff is married to Brown classmate Hilary Lambert and they have a daughter.

Filmography

Film

Television

Video games

References

External links

1968 births
Male actors from New York (state)
American male film actors
American male stage actors
American male television actors
Brown University alumni
Jewish American male actors
20th-century American male actors
21st-century American male actors
Living people
People from the Catskills
People from Liberty, New York
People from Monticello, New York
People from Thompson, New York
21st-century American Jews